Jean Mary Dawnay, Princess George Galitzine  (22 March 1925 – 14 December 2016) was a British fashion model, television personality, stage and film actress, who worked for Christian Dior.

Jean Mary Dawnay was born in Brighton on 22 March 1925. In their obituary, The Daily Telegraph called her "supermodel of the 1950s".

Dawnay, the daughter of Frederick Dawnay and Maud (née Howard), was educated at the City of London School for Girls and the Central School of Art and Design. Having joined the WAAF in 1943, she served in World War II under Leo Marks in the Special Operations Executive in Baker Street and at Bletchley Park.

Dawnay married Prince George Galitzine in Rome in 1963 and their daughter Princess Catherine "Katya" Galitzine was born in 1964. Throughout her career she was photographed by many leading photographers including John French, Richard Dormer, Cecil Beaton, Norman Parkinson, Antony Snowdon and Francis Goodman. She was associated with many of the leading fashion houses of the day including Christian Dior, by whom she was dubbed "The English Rose".

In later life, Dawnay was active in charity work, including UK Youth (for which she served as a vice president for 60 years), the Prince George Galitzine Library which she co-founded in 1994 in St Petersburg, the Terence Rattigan Society of which she was the inaugural president and Phab.

She was appointed MBE, for services to young people, in the 2012 Queen's Diamond Jubilee Birthday Honours (as Jean Mary Galitzine).

Filmography
 Wonderful Things! as Anne (1958)

References

1925 births
2016 deaths
British female models
Dior people
People from Brighton
British film actresses
20th-century British actresses
People educated at the City of London School for Girls